Bobbie Phillips (born January 29, 1968) is an American actress.

Career
Born in Charleston, South Carolina, Phillips moved to Hollywood in 1990 and began working in television soon after. Her first acting job was guest-starring with Halle Berry on the science-fiction Fox comedy They Came from Outer Space. Phillips was also a sought-after fitness and swimsuit model. Canadian bodybuilder and entrepreneur Joe Weider placed her under contract.

She landed her first regular television series for Paramount Pictures alongside Sir Mix-a-Lot in The Watcher. Phillips continued to land roles in television and independent films from comedies to martial arts films; Phillips is a trained martial artist and performed most of her fighting and stunts in these films.  On the television series The Crow: Stairway to Heaven (1998), Phillips played the dual role of Talon/Hannah Foster. Phillips was the first female to play the character of The Crow on screen. In between The Crow: Stairway to Heaven filming, Phillips also showed off her martial arts abilities in a series of tele-films for Paramount Pictures.

Paramount Pictures offered Phillips a studio contract after high ratings for Chameleon. It was followed by two sequels: Chameleon II: Death Match and Chameleon 3: Dark Angel.

Phillips appeared on numerous popular television shows such as The Hitchhiker, Stargate SG-1, The X-Files (Best Actress Winner), Married... with Children, Two Guys and a Girl and Baywatch.

Phillips was a regular on the first season of the 22nd People's Choice Awards winner for "Favorite New TV Dramatic Series" for Murder One. Phillips received praise from Variety for her role as Julie Costello.

She had a small role in the film Showgirls. She has also starred in several small independent films and has appeared on stage as well. Prior to acting professionally, Phillips starred in several musicals. She performed as a child at the Dock Street Theater in her hometown of Charleston, South Carolina. Phillips and Gibson later worked together, acting in the television series Dharma & Greg.

Phillips continued to perform in television sitcoms, dramas, and independent feature films up until her early retirement in 2003. Phillips' last film prior to retiring was Last Flight Out, in which she starred as a missionary doctor. Phillips returned to acting in 2014 with several independent feature films released in 2015 and 2016.

Personal life
Phillips is married to Anthony Filipetto, who was her hairstylist on several films and television shows, after meeting on the set of the film Hustle in 1999.  Phillips retired and left Hollywood in 2003. Bobbie and her husband travelled to Costa Rica to rescue animals and begin Anthony's surfing career. The couple travelled extensively between Canada, Fiji, Australia and Mexico before Bobbie moved to Anthony's home country of Canada. She appeared on the April 17, 2010 episode of the HGTV home design show Divine Design, where it was disclosed that she had recently moved to her husband Anthony's home country of Canada with their three dogs.

Phillips is involved in animal rescue work around the world.

She has one son named Mark from her previous marriage.

Beginning in 2016, Phillips branched out further in her animal rescue work and became involved with several elephant rescue organizations. In the same year she visited Sri Lanka and learned about the inner workings of the organization Embark, whose main focus is street dogs in the island nation.

Filmography

References

External links
 
 

1972 births
Actresses from Charleston, South Carolina
American film actresses
American television actresses
Living people
20th-century American actresses
21st-century American actresses